Chelsea Edghill (born July 6, 1997) is a Guyanese table tennis player who has competed at the Commonwealth Games and became the first player from Guyana to compete at the Olympic Games in Table Tennis.

Career
Edghill competes in the women's singles, women's doubles, mixed doubles, and team table tennis events, and is ranked #408 as an individual. In the 2014 Youth Olympic Games she placed 25th in the women's singles; in the 2018 Latin American Table Tennis Championships she went out in the preliminary round, and made it to the first round of the 2019 Pan American Games. In 2018 she was the Caribbean Senior Championships Under 21 champion. As a team athlete, she competed at the 2014 Glasgow Commonwealth Games.

In 2021, she became the first Guyanese Olympic table tennis competitor with her appearance at the 2020 Tokyo Olympics, being entered as a wild card, the only female tennis player to do so. She was also one of the nation's flagbearers during the opening ceremony. After defeating her opponent in the preliminary round, she was knocked out in the first round.

She resides in Aveiro, Portugal, and at the club level competes with Lusitania de Lourosa in Santa Maria da Feira.

Personal life
Edghill grew up in Georgetown, Guyana where she was raised with her two siblings. Edghill's brother Kyle has also competed for Guyana in table tennis, and their mother has managed the Guyanese youth table tennis team. She attended Lindenwood University in St. Charles, Missouri. She graduated in 2019  with a Bachelor's of Science in Chemistry.

References

1997 births
Living people
Guyanese female table tennis players
People from Aveiro, Portugal
People from Georgetown, Guyana
Olympic table tennis players of Guyana
Table tennis players at the 2020 Summer Olympics